Benjamin Marc Ramaroson, C.M. (born 25 April 1955 in Manakara) is Archbishop of the Roman Catholic Archdiocese of Antsiranana in Madagascar.

Biography
Ramaroson was ordained as a priest on 15 August 1984 for the Congregation of the Mission. He was appointed as bishop of the Roman Catholic Diocese of Farafangana by Pope Benedict XVI and consecrated in November 2005. As was appointed Archbishop of Antsiranana in November 2013 upon the retirement of Archbishop Michel Melo.

See also

References

External links
  Official website
 Profile of Bishop Ramaroson

1955 births
Living people
People from Vatovavy-Fitovinany
21st-century Roman Catholic bishops in Madagascar
Vincentian bishops
Malagasy Roman Catholic bishops
Roman Catholic archbishops of Antsiranana